Constantius I (1777 – 5 January 1859) was Ecumenical Patriarch during the period 1830–1834.

He was born in 1777 in Constantinople. He studied in the Patriarchal School, in Iași and in Kiev. In 1805, he was elected Archbishop of Sinai, a position he held until he was elected Ecumenical Patriarch in 1830. He resigned in 1834 and devoted his life to studying and writing. He died on 5 January 1859.

References 

1777 births
1859 deaths
Clergy from Istanbul
19th-century Ecumenical Patriarchs of Constantinople
Constantinopolitan Greeks